Margaret Clement or Clements (1508–1570), née Giggs, was one of the most educated women of the Tudor era and the foster daughter of Sir Thomas More.

Biography
Clement's maiden name was Giggs. She was born in 1508 and was the daughter of a gentleman of Norfolk. Sir Thomas More was her legal guardian, bringing her up from a child with his own daughter who was also named Margaret.  

Algebra was probably her special study and More had an "algorisme stone" of hers with him in the Tower of London during his imprisonment, which he sent back to her the day before his execution in 1535. 
In devotion to her Catholic faith and to its adherents, she risked her life to aid the Carthusian Martyrs, monks starved to death in prison for refusal to renounce the Faith. She obtained also the shirt in which Thomas More suffered, and preserved it as a relic. Sir Thomas Elyot had conveyed to her and her husband the indignation felt by Emperor Charles V, Catherine of Aragon's nephew, at More's resignation, but William Roper, writing years later, had the emperor talking about More's execution; as R. W. Chambers points out, Elyot was not ambassador to the imperial court when More died.

She remained a Roman Catholic, and died in exile at Mechlin, Duchy of Brabant, in the Habsburg Netherlands on 6 July 1570. She had two children. One daughter, Winifred, married William Rastell, a judge and More's nephew. Another, also Margaret Clement, led a convent in Leuven.

Education 
Clement received a humanist education from More despite the gender restrictions and roles. She excelled in math and medicine, yet was also educated in liberal studies such as theology and philosophy. She also had an outstanding command of Greek, as noted by Spanish scholar Juan Luis Vives.

While More provided extensive tutoring to Clement, he also enlisted the help of many other scholars, including John Clement and Nicholas Kratzer.

See also
 Carthusian Martyrs
 English Reformation
 Henry VIII of England
 Forty Martyrs of England and Wales

References

Further reading
Raymond Wilson Chambers (1935), Thomas More, London:  Cape.

1508 births
1570 deaths
People from Norfolk
English Roman Catholics
16th-century Roman Catholics
16th-century  English women
English expatriates in Belgium